Nairelis Nazareth Gutiérrez (born 2 July 1995) is a Venezuelan footballer who plays as a midfielder for Colombian club Junior Barranquilla and the Venezuela women's national team.

International career
Gutiérrez played for Venezuela at senior level in the 2018 Copa América Femenina and the 2018 Central American and Caribbean Games.

References

1995 births
Living people
Venezuelan women's footballers
Women's association football midfielders
Unión Magdalena footballers
ÖFB-Frauenliga players
Venezuela women's international footballers
Venezuelan expatriate women's footballers
Venezuelan expatriate sportspeople in Colombia
Expatriate women's footballers in Colombia
Venezuelan expatriate sportspeople in Austria
Expatriate women's footballers in Austria
Venezuelan expatriate sportspeople in Paraguay
Expatriate women's footballers in Paraguay